Jackson Township is a township in Lucas County, Iowa, USA.

History
Jackson Township was established in 1855.

References

Townships in Lucas County, Iowa
Townships in Iowa